Wincenty Aleksander Korwin Gosiewski de armis Ślepowron (c. 1620 – 29 November 1662) – was a Polish nobleman, general, Field-Commander of Lithuania from 1654, Grand Treasurer of Lithuania and Lithuanian Great-Quartermaster since 1652, General of Artillery of Lithuania from 1651, Grand-Master of the Pantry of Lithuania from 1646 (honorary court title).

Biography

Early life and first battles
After his father Aleksander, he became District-Governor of Puńsk and Marków, after his brother Krzysztof he became also District-Governor of Velizh. Speaker of the Parliament in Warsaw from 21 to 24 December 1650. Polish military commander and diplomat.
He came from the noble family Gosiewski entitled to use the coat of arms Ślepowron.  He was Aleksander Gosiewski'son, Palatine-Governor of Smolensk. He married Magdalena Konopacka, Elbląg Castle-Commander's daughter.
He graduated from the Vilnius University and studied in Vienna, Padua and Rome.
After returning home he was appointing by King Władysław IV Vasa  Grand Master of the Pantry of Lithuania, fulfilling this office he signed the document electing John II Casimir Vasa.

He began his military service as commander of the regiment that fought in 1648 running under the leadership of the Lithuanian Great-Commander Janusz Radziwiłł. In July 1649 as Janusz Radziwiłł's deputy commander in chief, he had a major part broken the troops of the Zaporozhian Cossacks in the Battle of Loyew. As  Artillery General in Lithuania in 1651, at the Battle of Chernobyl he broke Cossack troops commanded by colonels Antonov and Adamowicz. He participated as a Commissioner in the peace talks that led to the agreement of Biała Cerkiew.

Political and military career

In 1654 he received the Commander's baton/mace from Polish prince Janusz Radziwiłł, who was appointing the Lithuanian Great-Commander.
During the Swedish invasion he played an important role politically and militarily. In 1655, he accepted the Kiejdany act of recognition signed between usurper King Charles X Gustav of Sweden and Prince Janusz Radziwiłł, but soon came against this act taking action which aim was to help the Russian side. Despite being under surveillance, he managed to make contact with the Russian diplomat Vasily Likharov. Trapped by Janusz Radziwiłł he was catch in Kiejdany, where, as state prisoner was then transferred to Królewiec/Königsberg. 
While he was in captivity Karl Gustav was urged to attack Russia and a written confirmation of that intention was given to Tsar Alexis of Muscovy after his release. In the spring of 1656 he escaped from Prussian slavery to Lithuania where in a short time, at their own expense, he organized several Banners.

Battling against Swedish forces, he reached up near Warsaw, where he was one of the royal commissioners that oversaw the takeover of the capital. He participated in the siege of Tykocin and the Battle of Warsaw (1656) after which the Swedish army again occupied the city. Then, on the King's orders, he moved with its banners into the Duchy of Prussia and Lithuania. On 8 October 1656, at the battle of Prostki, he completely smashed the Brandenburgian and Swedish armies, capturing Prince Bogusław Radziwiłł. The battle has been describe by Henryk Sienkiewicz's novel The Deluge. Another battle fought under his command, on 22 October 1656, was the Battle of Filipów however; it ended with a victory for the forces commanded by Field Marshal Gustaf Otto Stenbock, in the confusion of the battle the Prince Bogusław Radziwiłł managed to escape. 
In November 1656 at Wierzbowo he signed a truce with Frederick William, Elector of Brandenburg, then as royal commissioner in 1657, he led a ceasefire and conclude the Treaty of Bromberg. In 1658 he fought against the Swedes in the areas of Livonia and Samogitia.
In 1658 he participated in the delegation sent by the King to negotiate with Russia. Beaten at the Battle of Werki he was captured and imprisoned during nearly four years. He was released from captivity in Moscow in 1662. As compensation for the harm that he had suffered, he received the former Radziwiłł's estate in Kiejdany.

Obedience to the King and death
He was a supporter of a strong and centralized royal power (limiting Liberum Veto), and supported the concept of a successor of the throne with the current King being still alive (Vivente Rege – a kind of Royal election). At the command of the King wanted to solve the issue of the Fraternal Association, an insurrection created by some long unpaid members of the army claiming the termination of obedience to the King (at the beginning for economic reasons, but later, considering any limitation to Liberum Veto and Vivente Rege proposal as "treason" to Commonwealth constitutional laws). In July 1662, he went to Vilnius for talks with the rebel troops in Lithuania. There he was treacherously captured by Konstanty Kotowski, Deputy Speaker of the Fraternal Association, which is thus intended to prevent any agreement that may in effect resulted in the termination of the insurrection. Wincenty Korwin Gosiewski was shot to death on 29 November 1662 near Ostrynia [=Astryna]. Later, the perpetrators of the murder were sentenced to death.

Marriage and family

Wincenty Korwin Gosiewski's children and Magdalena Konopacki were:

Bogusław Korwin Gosiewski de armis Ślepowron (born in November 1660, d. 23 June 1744) –Bishop of Smolensk on 29 January 1725,  Lithuanian Great (Clergyman) Quartermaster in 1720, Preceptor and Curator of Vilnius Cathedral, Vicar of Onikszty.
Teresa Korwin Gosiewska, properly Princess Teresa Sapieha (died 1708) – married, 
Her first husband, Józef Bogusław Słuszka de armis Ostoja (1652 –1701) was Field-Commander of Lithuania, Castle-Commander of Vilnius, Court Marshal of Lithuania, Great-Standard-Bearer of Lithuania, Great-Hunter of Lithuania, District-Governor of Rzeczyca, Lanckorona, Pinsk, Pieniawa and Jeziera. 
Her second husband, Jan Kazimierz Sapieha the Younger, de armis Lis, was Great Cup-Bearer of Lithuania, Deputy Master of the Pantry of Lithuania, Court Treasurer of Lithuania, Field Commander of Lithuania, District-Governor of Zmuzka and Brzeg, Palatine-Governor of Vilnius and Great Commander of Lithuania.
She had not offspring of both marriages.

Zofia Korwin Gosiewska – she married Aleksander Przyjemski, de armis Rawa, High Steward of the Crown.

After Wincenty Korwin Gosiewski's death, his widow married Prince Janusz Karol Czartoryski, Chamberlain of Kraków.

References 
 Paweł Jasienica: Rzeczpospolita Obojga Narodów. Calamitatis Regnum. Warszawa: Państwowy Instytut Wydawniczy, 1986. .

1620s births
1662 deaths
People from Kamenets District
People from Brest Litovsk Voivodeship
Wincenty Korwin
Field Hetmans of the Grand Duchy of Lithuania
Generals of the Polish–Lithuanian Commonwealth
Marshals of the Sejm of the Polish–Lithuanian Commonwealth
Secular senators of the Polish–Lithuanian Commonwealth
Diplomats of the Polish–Lithuanian Commonwealth
Polish people of the Russo-Polish War (1654–1667)
Polish military personnel of the Khmelnytsky Uprising
Grand Treasurers of the Grand Duchy of Lithuania